Owen C. Trainor (16 October 1894 – 28 November 1956) was a Progressive Conservative member of the House of Commons of Canada.

He was born in Moncton, New Brunswick and studied medicine at Saint Dunstan's College in Charlottetown, then at McGill University in Montreal. From there, Trainor became a physician in Winnipeg.

He was elected to represent the Winnipeg South riding in the 1953 general election, which had become open following the retirement of MP Leslie Mutch. Trainor served as an opposition member of Parliament. He died of a heart attack at his House of Commons office before the end of the 22nd Canadian Parliament.

References

External links
 

1894 births
1956 deaths
Physicians from Manitoba
McGill University alumni
Members of the House of Commons of Canada from Manitoba
Progressive Conservative Party of Canada MPs
People from Moncton